Hugo Jeske was a member of the Wisconsin State Assembly.

Biography
Jeske was born on August 3, 1873, in Milwaukee, Wisconsin. He attended Lutheran parochial schools and Concordia Theological College. Jeske died on March 3, 1920.

Career
Jeske was elected to the Assembly in 1916. He was a Republican.

Notes

References

Politicians from Milwaukee
1873 births
1920 deaths
Republican Party members of the Wisconsin State Assembly